MedSTAR is the single medical retrieval service for the state of South Australia. Formed in 2007, it is controlled by the state government under the Department of Health through the SA Ambulance Service and provides emergency medical retrieval services. MedSTAR is designed to respond to trauma, medical and disaster emergencies anywhere within the state. MedSTAR Kids is the paediatric and neonatal wing of the retrieval service which commenced operations in February 2010.

History
MedSTAR's development commenced during 2007 and it has been operating since early 2009. Prior to MedSTAR's inception, emergency medical retrievals were carried out by one of three possible teams: one from the Royal Adelaide Hospital (RAH), one from the Flinders Medical Centre (FMC) and one from the Women's and Children's Hospital (WCH - for paediatric or neonatal emergencies). In a case where a helicopter would be needed, one would be dispatched to either the RAH or FMC (the WCH team would travel to the RAH because WCH doesn't have a helipad) after the appropriate and most available team was selected. After picking up the retrieval team members it would then head to the emergency. This setup meant it could take up to half an hour before the team was en route to the patient. As a result, it was decided that one single service based near the helicopter would be more appropriate as it would cut down response times and resolve issues pertaining as to which team would be chosen to retrieve the patient/s.

Another issue that was prevalent in the old system was a lack of uniform standards. The RAH and FMC teams were trained differently, had different equipment and different levels of qualifications. The old system also lacked a single point of contact, so requesting retrievals was a tricky process and there was also a lack of dedicated rapid response vehicles for road based retrievals. With one statewide service, these issues were resolved.

About MedSTAR's Services
Around 20% of MedSTAR's work involves responding to metropolitan emergencies, such as motor vehicle crashes. However the majority of MedSTAR's work is critical-care transportation, to allow already hospitalised patients who require a higher-level of care access to Intensive Care beds at better equipped and staffed hospitals. Examples of this might include a patient at a metropolitan hospital that has an insufficient ICU or no ICU beds available or a patient from a rural hospital that needs a higher-level of care than the hospital can provide. MedSTAR can also be contacted by doctors for advice on patient care. The service also has a neonatal and paediatric division called MedSTAR Kids.

MedSTAR responds to various emergencies such as medical emergencies (such as acute pulmonary oedema) as well as primary trauma (such as a severe crash).

At the moment MedSTAR teams are airborne within 10 to 15 minutes after being tasked to a job, however the base will be moved closer to the helipad within the near future cutting this time down to around 5 minutes.

Aircraft
MedSTAR utilise six of the Motor Accident Commission (MAC) sponsored helicopters to respond to emergencies. These helicopters are operated and crewed by Australian Helicopters. The six helicopters are:
 Bell 412 x4
 MBB/Kawasaki BK 117 (Rescue 52)
 Eurocopter EC130 (primarily used by South Australia Police, but can be used by MedSTAR if it is necessary.) (Rescue 53/POLAIR)

Only two bell 412 are in service at any time the other two are on maintenance rotations or are active spares

The colour schemes for the 412s are:
2x red and white- VH-LSA/VH-VAO
1x solid white- VH-PXY
1x blue and white- VH-VAU

Also in use are Holden TrailBlazers rapid response vehicles, similar to the SA Ambulance Service Command/Team Leader vehicles.

See also
Air ambulance

References

External links
 MedSTAR website
 "Towards a Statewide South Australian Retrieval Service" - SA Health Publication PDF

Air ambulance services in Australia
Emergency services in South Australia